Genaro García Luna (born July 10, 1968) is a former Mexican government official and engineer. He served as Secretary of Public Security in the federal cabinet of Felipe Calderón.

Since his term working for the Mexican government, García Luna has worked as a consultant and businessman evaluating the social, political and financial economics of Mexico and Latin America. He is a partner in the company GLAC, which provides an index to evaluate risk and security conditions. The GLAC index is published in El Heraldo de México and El Financiero. It is used by the business community to evaluate the risk and security conditions for different states and cities in Mexico.

García Luna was included in a list of the "10 most corrupt Mexicans" published by Forbes in 2013. He broke a self-imposed silence in a letter to Steve Forbes that his inclusion in the list was based on lies and that it lacked journalistic integrity.

He is the author of Contra el crimen: ¿Por qué 1,661 corporaciones de policía no bastan? Pasado, Presente y Futuro de la Policía en México (2006) [Against Crime: Why 1,661 police forces are not enough. Past, Present and Future of Police in Mexico], where he first laid out the basic concepts of the New Police Model for Mexico, placing the emphasis on the importance of intelligence tasks, and “El Nuevo Modelo de Seguridad para México” (2011), which indicates what are the considerations and the state vision to confront a national priority.

In the 2018 trial of the drug kingpin Joaquín "El Chapo" Guzmán Loera, El Chapo's partner Ismael Zambada García’s brother, Jesus Zambada García, testified to bribing García Luna with suitcases stuffed with $3 million in cash on two occasions. 

On December 9, 2019, García Luna was arrested in Dallas on charges of taking millions in bribes from the Sinaloa Cartel.

On February 21, 2023, García Luna was declared guilty of all five counts by a federal jury in Brooklyn, New York, making the once-highest ranking law enforcement official in Mexico now a convicted felon.

Early life and education
García Luna was born in Mexico City. He completed his master's degree in Business (MBA) from the University of Miami in May 2015. He holds a B.Sc. in Mechanical Engineering from the Autonomous Metropolitan University (UAM) and a Diploma in Strategic Planning from the Accountancy and Administration Faculty of the National Autonomous University of Mexico (UNAM).

Career
His training includes specialization from security and intelligence agencies in the United States, Spain, Israel, France, Colombia and Japan. 

In 1989, García Luna started his career in intelligence at the Centro de Investigación y Seguridad Nacional (Center for National Security and Investigation, CISEN), where he was responsible for Counterintelligence and Terrorism.

In 1998, he became the Coordinator General for Intelligence of the Preventive Federal Police, where he designed the conceptual framework for intelligence areas and their executive integration. 

In 2000, after winning the position in an open contest, he was named Director for Planning and Operation for the Federal Judicial Police, where he began a re-engineering process for the agency. It included new administrative structures and operational concepts, and incorporated cutting-edge information systems. This process made way for the Federal Investigation Agency. 

In 2001, he was designated founder and Director General of the Agencia Federal de Investigación (Federal Investigation Agency). In his administration, this agency received the INNOVA 2005 award for its practice of “Real-Time Kidnap Investigation”, and the ISO 9001:2000 certification for 33 of its procedures in different areas.

As head of the Agencia Federal de Investigación (AFI), García Luna became the target of widespread criticism after the discovery that a December 9, 2005 police raid conducted by the AFI on a ranch where kidnapping victims were supposedly being held was staged for the Mexican public to see on live television. The alleged kidnappers, who were presented to the Mexican public as having been detained live at the scene, were actually detained the previous morning, on December 8, 2005, offsite, and were held illegally without being presented to a judge during almost 20 hours. Furthermore, one of the alleged kidnappers sustains that he was tortured into playing along. These and many other violations of due process irremediably polluted the case and, to this day, it is impossible to know what really happened.

On December 1, 2006, García Luna became Secretary of Public Security of México. Since then, he founded the Federal Police Force which began operating in June 2009, under the New Police Model, designed by him. 

In April 2011, Garcia Luna became president of the XXVIII International Drug Enforcement Conference (IDEC), whose World Summit was held in Mexico.

On April 9, 2015, Genaro Garcia Luna was nominated for election as Member of the Board of SecureAlert, Inc., a Utah (USA) based company active in the offender monitoring business. SecureAlert, Inc. is controlled by Sapinda Asia, Ltd. and Mr. Lars Windhorst, beneficially owning 51.6% of the outstanding shares of the company SecureAlert. Inc, as of March 6, 2015.

Financial transparency

García Luna has been unable to explain his personal wealth, which includes luxury homes and real estate in Mexico City which would be unaffordable on a Mexican civil servant's salary. It is noted however that García's family has owned several properties in the area which may have been inherited by him.

However, an alternative explanation was offered by a witness in the 2018 trial of Joaquín "El Chapo" Guzmán. During the trial, the brother of El Chapo's former partner Ismael Zambada García testified to bribing García Luna with suitcases stuffed with $3 million in cash on two occasions.

Trial

On December 9, 2019, García Luna was arrested in Dallas on charges of taking millions in bribes from the Sinaloa cartel. At that time it was also reported that the Attorney General of Mexico (FGR) was looking to extradite him to Mexico on related charges.

The New York Times reported that the prosecution intended to introduce  of cocaine and 4 kg of heroin confiscated in four raids as evidence against Garcia Luna. They also planned to use financial records and intercepted communications at the trial scheduled to begin on July 30, 2020.

U.S. courts denied Garcia Luna's requests for release on bond in March and April 2020. Roberta S. Jacobson, the former U.S. ambassador to Mexico (2016-2018), asserted on May 3, 2020, that the Calderón government knew of the ties Genaro García Luna had with the Sinaloa Cartel. Ex-president Felipe Calderón insisted they did not.

He pleaded not guilty to the charges against him on October 7, 2020. On February 21, 2023, a Brooklyn jury found him guilty of all charges with his sentencing scheduled for June 27.

See also
Mexican Executive Cabinet
Felipe Calderón Hinojosa

References

Bibliography
 ¿Por qué 1,661 corporaciones de policía no bastan? – Pasado, Presente y Futuro de la Policía en México. Primera Edición, abril de 2006 (Impreso en México / Derechos Reservados).  / Copyright © 2006 Ing. Genaro García Luna
 Para entender: El Nuevo Modelo de Seguridad para México. Primera Edición: Nostras Ediciones, 2011 (www.nostraediciones.com.  / Copyright © 2011 Nostra Ediciones S.A. de C.V. (Ing. Genaro García Luna)

External links
Mexico - Presidency of the Republic website 

Mexican mechanical engineers
Mexican Secretaries of Public Safety
People from Mexico City
Living people
1968 births
University of Miami Business School alumni
Universidad Autónoma Metropolitana alumni